Bodenschatz is a German surname. Notable people with the surname include:

Eberhard Bodenschatz (born 1959), German physicist
Johann Christian Georg Bodenschatz (1717–1797), German Protestant theologian
Karl Bodenschatz (1890–1979), German military officer

German-language surnames